is a railway station on the Keihan Ōtō Line located in Sakyō-ku, Kyoto, Japan.

The station was named after Marutamachi Street as it is located where the railway beneath Kawabata Street crosses Marutamachi Street, and Heian Shrine (Heian Jingū) along Marutamachi Street. This is the second station along Marutamachi Street named Marutamachi; Marutamachi Station is on the Karasuma Line subway.

Trains served
Local, sub-express and express trains of the Ōtō Line, most of which continue to the Keihan Main Line, stop at the station while rapid express trains and limited express trains pass.

Layout
The station in a double track section has one underground island platform with two tracks. Stairs, escalators and elevators connect the platform on the second basement to the first basement concourse and then to the ground level.

History
The station opened on October 5, 1989, when the Ōtō Line started operation.

References

Railway stations in Kyoto
Railway stations in Japan opened in 1989